Leiknisvöllur is a multi-use stadium in Reykjavik, Iceland. It is currently used mostly for football matches and is the home stadium of Ungmennafélagið Afturelding. Its capacity is around 1500.

References

Football venues in Iceland